This is a list of mobile network operators in Uganda:

 MTN Uganda
 Airtel Uganda
 Uganda Telecom
 Smile Telecom 
 Lycamobile Uganda.

Note: K2 Telecom operates as a component of Airtel Uganda.

Customer base
, there were an estimated 20.4 million mobile subscribers out of an estimated population of 39.6 million; a 51.5 percent penetration rate. By March 2018, the number of mobile phone users had increased to 24.8 million, a 70.9 percent penetration rate. As of June 2020, the number of mobile telephone customers were estimated at 25.5 million, as reported by the Daily Monitor newspaper. That figure had increased to 26.5 million at the end of September 2020.

As of 31 March 2017, Uganda had the 18th highest Internet usage rate in Africa (out of 58 countries). The country had 13,023,114 Internet users out of a population of 41,652,938, bringing the Internet penetration rate to 31.3 percent. As of September 2020, Uganda recorded 20.1 million Internet users, out of an estimated mid-year population of 41.58 million, bringing internet penetration to 48.3 percent, nationwide.

Market share
The table below illustrates the market share of each of the major mobile network operators in the country, as of December 2021.

Note: Totals may be off, due to rounding.

When Africell exited Uganda, after 7 October 2021, a total of 3.3 million mobile subscribers in Uganda were up for grabs between the remaining four mobile network operators in the country.

See also
 Uganda Communications Commission
 List of companies based in Uganda
 Economy of Uganda

References

External links
Internet key to growth, Airtel boss As of 13 June 2018. 
Communications in Uganda: A look at one of Africa’s fastest growing markets As of August 2009.
Price wars: Telecoms are likely to bleed

 
Kampala District
Uganda communications-related lists
Lists of companies of Uganda